The 2d Combat Cargo Group is an inactive United States Army Air Forces unit.  The unit was organized at Syracuse Army Air Base in New York.  It operated during World War II in the Southwest Pacific, transporting passengers and cargo. Its last duty station under this designation was Yokota Air Base, Japan, where it was inactivated on 15 January 1946.

Although the group was disbanded in 1948, it was reconstituted in 1985 as the 362d Military Airlift Group.  It was activated at Rhein-Main Air Base, Germany in 1992 as the 362d Airlift Support Group.  Inactivated in 1994, in 2002 it was converted to provisional status as the 362d Air Expeditionary Group

History

World War II
The 2d Combat Cargo Group was organized at Syracuse Army Air Base, New York, and trained with Curtiss C-46 Commando and Douglas C-47 Skytrain aircraft.  It moved to Baer Field, Indiana for overseas processing. Its operational squadrons were the 5th, 6th, 7th, and 8th Combat Cargo Squadrons. The group moved to the Southwest Pacific, arriving in November 1944, and assigned to Fifth Air Force. It initially operated from Biak Island, Papua New Guinea to fly passengers and cargo to US bases in Australia, New Guinea, the Admiralties, and the Philippines. The group also dropped supplies to US and guerrilla forces in the Philippines. The group moved to Leyte in May 1945. Maintaining its flights in the Southwest Pacific, it also transported personnel and supplies to the Ryukyus, and evacuated casualties on return flights. The 2d moved to Okinawa in August 1945. While there it transported personnel and equipment of the occupation forces to Japan and ferried liberated prisoners of war back to the Philippines. The group moved to Japan in September 1945 and served with the occupation forces until it was inactivated on 15 January 1946. It was disbanded on 8 October 1948.

Reconstitution
The group was reconstituted on 31 July 1985 and redesignated as the 362d Military Airlift Group, It was not active under this designation, but was redesignated as the 362d Airlift Support Group and activated on 1 April 1992 at Rhein-Main Air Base, Germany.  It was inactivated c. 1 July 1994.  It has since been converted to provisional status as the 362d Air Expeditionary Group and assigned to Air Mobility Command to activate as needed.

Lineage
 Constituted as the 2d Combat Cargo Group on 25 April 1944
 Activated on 1 May 1944
 Inactivated on 15 January 1946
 Disbanded on 8 October 1948
 Reconstituted on 31 July 1985 and redesignated as the 362d Military Airlift Group
 Redesignated 362d Airlift Support Group
 Activated on 1 April 1992
 Inactivated c. 1 July 1994
 Redesignated 362d Air Expeditionary Group and converted to provisional status on 12 June 2002

Assignments
 I Troop Carrier Command, 1 May 1944
 Fifth Air Force, November 1944
 54th Troop Carrier Wing, 13 December 1944 – 5 January 1946
 Twenty-First Air Force, 1 April 1992 – ca. 1 July 1994
 Air Mobility Command to activate or inactivate as needed, 12 June 2002

Stations
 Syracuse Army Air Base, New York, 1 May 1944
 Baer Field, Indiana, 9–27 October 1944
 Mokmer Airfield, Biak Island, Netherlands East Indies, November 1944
 Dulag Airfield, Leyte, Philippines, May 1945
 Bolo Airfield, Okinawa, c. 20 August 1945
 Yokota Airfield, Japan, c. 22 September 1945 – 15 January 1946
 Rhein-Main Air Base, Germany, 1 April 1992 – ca. 1 July 1994

Aircraft
 Curtiss C-46 Commando, 1944–1946
 Douglas C-47 Skytrain, 1944, 1945

Awards
 
 Air Force Outstanding Unit Award, 1 April 1992 – 30 June 1993
 
 Philippine Republic Presidential Unit Citation
 
 Asiatic Pacific Campaign Medal
 Campaigns

 Air Offensive, Japan
 New Guinea
 Western Pacific
 Leyte

 Luzon
 Southern Philippines
 Ryukyus

 
 World War II Army of Occupation Medal

References

Notes
 Explanatory notes

 Citations

Bibliography

 
 

Combat cargo groups of the United States Army Air Forces
1944 establishments in New York (state)
1946 disestablishments in Japan
Military units and formations established in 1944
Military units and formations disestablished in 1948